Alcohol Fueled Brewtality Live!! +5 is a live album by American heavy metal band Black Label Society. It was recorded on October 28, 2000, at The Troubadour in West Hollywood. Disc 2 consists of five new studio tracks. This is the first release by the band that features drummer Craig Nunenmacher.

On June 18, 2001, the album was performed by Zakk Wylde at Ozzfest.

Track listing

Personnel
Black Label Society
Zakk Wylde – vocals, guitar; bass and piano on disc 2
Nick Catanese – guitar (disc 1 only)
Steve Gibb – bass (disc 1 only)
Craig Nunenmacher – drums

Production
Produced by Zakk Wylde and Eddie Mapp
Engineered by Eddie Mapp
Mixed by Zakk Wylde and Eddie Mapp, except "Heart of Gold" and "Snowblind", mixed by Zakk Wylde and Sam Storey
Mastered by Ron Boustead

References

Black Label Society albums
2001 live albums
Spitfire Records live albums
Albums recorded at the Troubadour